Rush is the second extended play by the South Korean boy group Monsta X. It was released by Starship Entertainment and distributed by LOEN Entertainment on September 7, 2015. It also consists of six tracks, including the title track of the same name and "Hero".

Background and release
The album pictorial was worked with Jay Ahn, producer of Zenith Division, a content company of KCM Agency. He is in charge of music videos and photos of world-class pop stars such as Feast Movement, Chris Brown, and Omarion, and is currently popular as the hottest creative director in the United States.

The group held a media and fan showcase at the Ilchi Art Hall in Cheongdam-dong, Seoul on September 7.

The physical EP was released in two versions; Official and Secret, with different packaging and later digitally repackaged, along with broadcasting version of "Hero" as its title track.

Composition
The EP highlights the characteristics of black music, such as trap, pop rap, and contemporary R&B, while emphasizing the members' capabilities and teamwork, and containing some of its dynamic arrangement and musical wit.

"Rush" is a hip-hop track armed with the members' masculinity and wit, a bold yet ambitious theme for a woman, along with sharp flow, aggressive, and neatly refined harmony which stands out. "Hero" is a song that has a unique brass sound and sub-bass progress, that are well harmonized to lead the groove, while the dramatic and majestic song development has been doubled, and it is preparing to establish itself as another signature track of Monsta X through sensual and sophisticated sound making.

Commercial performance
As of 2020, the EP had sold a total of 78,744 copies, per the Gaon Music Chart in South Korea.

"Rush" debuted and peaked at number 139 on the weekly Gaon Digital Chart, as well as entering at number 15 on the weekly Billboard World Digital Song Sales chart in 2021.

Track listing

Charts

Album

Weekly chart

Monthly chart

Year-end chart

Songs

Weekly charts

Sales

Awards and nominations

Release history

See also
 List of K-pop songs on the Billboard charts
 List of K-pop songs on the World Digital Song Sales chart

References

2015 EPs
Korean-language EPs
Kakao M EPs
Monsta X EPs
Starship Entertainment EPs